Phalaenopsis × leucorrhoda is a species of orchid native to the Philippines. It is a natural hybrid of Phalaenopsis aphrodite and Phalaenopsis schilleriana.

Etymology
The specific epithet leucorrhoda, composed of leuco meaning white and rhodo meaning rose-coloured, is derived from the floral colouration.

Taxonomy
It has been confused with Phalaenopsis philippinensis, from which it differs in regard to the morphology of the callus of the labellum.

References 

leucorrhoda
Orchid hybrids
Hybrid plants
Plant nothospecies
Interspecific plant hybrids
Plants described in 1875
Orchids of the Philippines